Sunnyside is a historic home located at Greenwood, Greenwood County, South Carolina. It was built in 1851, and is a 1 1/2-half story house modeled after Sunnyside, the home of Washington Irving.  It has flush board siding covering the front façade and weatherboard siding covering the remainder of the house. It is basically Gothic Revival in style, featuring a gabled roof and dormers with scalloped bargeboard. It features a Greek Revival style portico.

It was listed on the National Register of Historic Places in 1978.

References

Houses on the National Register of Historic Places in South Carolina
Greek Revival houses in South Carolina
Gothic Revival architecture in South Carolina
Houses completed in 1851
National Register of Historic Places in Greenwood County, South Carolina
Houses in Greenwood County, South Carolina
1851 establishments in South Carolina
Buildings and structures in Greenwood, South Carolina